Piccadilly station may refer to:

Manchester Piccadilly station
Piccadilly Circus tube station